Guélor Kanga (born 1 September 1990) is a Gabonese professional footballer who plays as an attacking midfielder for Red Star Belgrade and the Gabon national team.

Club career

Early years in Gabon
Kanga started playing with AS Mangasport in 2007. Immediately in his first season as a senior at the club, he won the Gabon Championnat National D1. In the following seasons Mangasport finished third in 2008–09 and second in 2009–10. After three seasons at Mangasport, in 2010 he moved to Missile FC and took a part in the 2010–11 championship winning campaign. However, the following season they failed to achieve the same goal and finished 5th.  In the 2012–13 season Mounana won the Coupe du Gabon Interclubs, a title Manga was still missing among the domestic ones.

Rostov

On 9 February 2013, Kanga signed a 3.5-year deal with Russian Premier League side FC Rostov. Kanga made his debut in the Russian Premier League on 9 March 2013 for FC Rostov against FC Alania Vladikavkaz.

Kanga received a three match ban in December 2014 after being sent-off for Rostov vs FC Spartak Moscow for responding to racist abuse from the Spartak fans with an obscene gesture.

During the four seasons Kanga spent at Rostov, he made 70 appearances in the Russian Premier League and scored on seven occasions. The first three seasons Rostov performed mostly mid-table however in his last season there the club finished second. By then Kanga became the main target of Miodrag Božović who had coached him at Rostov between 2012 and 2014 and was now at Serbian side Red Star Belgrade who had won the championship and were reinforcing the team for their 2016–17 UEFA Champions League campaign.

Red Star Belgrade
On 1 July 2016, Kanga signed a two-year deal with Red Star Belgrade. Kanga was Miodrag Božović's transfer wish for Red Star's upcoming Champions League campaign, as Kanga and Božović had known each other over two years at FC Rostov. Kanga was the first Gabonese footballer in 33 years to play on Serbian soil, as the previous one was actually the first ever footballer from Africa to play in Yugoslav First League, Gabonese international Anselme Delicat, who in 1983 debuted for Serbian club FK Vojvodina. He opened way for numerous players from other African countries that came after him to the region.

Kanga made his debut in an official match for Red Star on July 12, 2016, as a starter in the first leg of the second qualifying round of the 2016–17 UEFA Champions League against Valletta F.C. away. Red Star won 1–2, and he assisted team mate Aleksandar Katai for the equalizer. Kanga scored his first goal for Red Star in the first leg of the third qualifying round against Ludogorets in Razgrad after a "parabola" shot from distance. Three days later he made his SuperLiga debut in a win against Metalac.

Sparta Prague
Kanga was transferred to Czech team Sparta Prague on 2 February 2018 for an undisclosed fee. He scored 15 league goals from well executed penalties, another 13 from game.

Red Star Belgrade
On 31 July 2020, Kanga signed a three-year deal with Red Star Belgrade.

International career
Ever since his debut in 2012, Kanga has been a regular at Gabon national football team. He was selected for the Gabon team at the 2015 Africa Cup of Nations and played all three games in the group.

It was no surprise his call for the Gabon squad to play in the 2017 Africa Cup of Nations of which Gabon were the hosts. Kanga featured for Gabon in the Africa Cup of Nations 2021 tournament in Cameroon.

Personal life
In December 2021, Guélor Kanga acquired Serbian citizenship.

Controversy
In April 2021, the Congolese Association Football Federation submitted a lawsuit against the country of Gabon for falsification of Kanga's identity. They claim that Kanga is born in Congo and is in fact four years older than the Gabonese birth certificate shows and that his birth name is Kiaku-Kiaku Kianga; allegedly, the Gabonese authorities gave him Gabonese citizenship with a new falsified birth certificate.
Additionally, in May 2021, it was reported that the CAF began investigating after there were allegations that his mother died in 1986, despite his registered date of birth which is September 1990.

Career statistics

Club

International

As of match played 17 November 2018. Gabon score listed first, score column indicates score after each Kanga goal.

Honours

Club
Mangasport
Gabon Championnat National D1: 2007–08
	
Missile
Gabon Championnat National D1: 2010–11
	
Mounana
Coupe du Gabon Interclubs: 2013

Rostov
Russian Cup: 2013–14

Sparta Prague
Czech Cup: 2019–20

Red Star Belgrade
Serbian SuperLiga (3): 2017–18, 2020–21, 2021–22
Serbian Cup (2): 2020–21, 2021–22

References

External links
 Profile by the Russian Premier League
 
 
 

1990 births
Living people
People from Oyem
Gabonese footballers
Serbian footballers
Association football midfielders
AS Mangasport players
Missile FC players
CF Mounana players
Russian Premier League players
FC Rostov players
Serbian SuperLiga players
Red Star Belgrade footballers
Czech First League players
AC Sparta Prague players
Gabon international footballers
2015 Africa Cup of Nations players
2017 Africa Cup of Nations players
Gabonese expatriate footballers
Expatriate footballers in Russia
Expatriate footballers in Serbia
Expatriate footballers in the Czech Republic
Naturalized citizens of Serbia
Serbian people of Gabonese descent
Age controversies
21st-century Gabonese people
2021 Africa Cup of Nations players